Choke Yasuoka (Japanese: 安岡チョーク, born January 18, 1973, in Pran Buri District, Thailand) is a wheelchair racer, who competes at Olympic level for Japan. At the 2004 Olympic Games, he finished 6th in the demonstration sport of Men's 1500m wheelchair. He also participated in the 2004 Summer Paralympics, winning silver in the 400 metres, gold in the 800 metres, and bronze in the 4×400 metre relay.  He has also competed in wheelchair marathon races, including the Boston Marathon and the Ōita Marathon.

References

External links
 

1973 births
Living people
Japanese male wheelchair racers
Olympic wheelchair racers of Japan
Wheelchair racers at the 2004 Summer Olympics
Paralympic athletes of Japan
Athletes (track and field) at the 2004 Summer Paralympics
Paralympic gold medalists for Japan
Paralympic silver medalists for Japan
Paralympic bronze medalists for Japan
Paralympic wheelchair racers
Medalists at the 2004 Summer Paralympics
Paralympic medalists in athletics (track and field)
21st-century Japanese people